A Handful of Soil is a 1957 Turkish romantic drama film directed by Osman F. Seden. The stars of the film are Talat Artemel, Pervin Par, Turgut Özatay, Ayhan Işık, Atıf Kaptan, and Nubar Terziyan.

References

External links
 
 

1957 films
Turkish romantic drama films
Films based on Turkish novels
1957 romantic drama films